Lazar Elenovski (born 19 March 1971 Macedonian: Лазар Еленовски) is a Republic of Macedonia politician, former Minister of Defence, elected on 26 August 2006. Born in Skopje, he is a graduate of the Faculty of Economy at the Ss. Cyril and Methodius University in Skopje, and married with two children. Currently, he is a president of a small political party called Social Democratic Union (SDU). His father is Macedonian descent and his mother is of Albanian origin. He Speaks Macedonian, Albanian and Dutch.

References

External links

 Biography at the Government of the Republic of Macedonia
 Biography at the Ministry of Defence

1971 births
Living people
Politicians from Skopje
Defence ministers of North Macedonia
Social Democratic Union of Macedonia politicians
Ss. Cyril and Methodius University of Skopje alumni
Albanians in North Macedonia